Sir Robert Henry Clive  (23 December 1877 – 13 May 1948) was a British diplomat.

Early life
Clive was the son of Charles Meysey Bolton Clive and the great-grandson of Edward Clive. His mother was Lady Katherine Elizabeth Mary Julia, daughter of William Feilding, 7th Earl of Denbigh. He was educated at Haileybury College and Magdalen College, Oxford.
 
Clive married the Hon. Magdalen, daughter of Kenneth Muir Mackenzie, 1st Baron Muir-Mackenzie, in 1905. They had two sons and one daughter.

Career
Clive entered the Diplomatic Service in 1902. He was General-Consul for Bavaria between 1923 and 1924 and for Morocco between 1924 and 1926 and Envoy Extraordinary and Minister Plenipotentiary to Persia between 1926 and 1931 and to the Holy See between 1933 and 1934.

In 1935 he was appointed British Ambassador to Japan, a post he held until 1937.

Clive served as British Ambassador to Belgium between 1937 and 1939. Clive was sworn of the Privy Council in 1934 and appointed a GCMG in 1937. He retired from the Diplomatic Service in 1939.

Later life
Clive died in May 1948, aged 70. Lady Clive died in October 1971, aged 87.

See also
 List of diplomats from the United Kingdom to Iran
 List of Ambassadors from the United Kingdom to the Holy See
 List of Ambassadors from the United Kingdom to Japan
 List of Ambassadors from the United Kingdom to Belgium
 Anglo-Japanese relations

Notes

References
 Hoare, James. (1999). Embassies in the East: the Story of the British Embassies in Japan, China, and Korea from 1859 to the Present.  Richmond, Surrey: Curzon Press. ;  OCLC 42645589

Further reading
 Great Britain. Public Record Office. Foreign Office files for Japan and the Far East. Series one, Embassy and consular archives, Japan (Public Record Office class FO 262). Part 6, Economic and military expansion renewed : withdrawal from the League of Nations, the North China incident, European Crisis and an "open door" in the Far East : (FO 262/1861-1988, 2004-2032, 2036-2039) : detailed correspondence for 1934-1940. ;  OCLC 224267234
 Nish, Ian. (2004). British Envoys in Japan 1859-1972. Folkestone, Kent: Global Oriental. ;  OCLC 249167170

External links
 UK in Japan,  Chronology of Heads of Mission

1877 births
1948 deaths
People educated at Haileybury and Imperial Service College
Alumni of Magdalen College, Oxford
Knights Grand Cross of the Order of St Michael and St George
Members of the Privy Council of the United Kingdom
Ambassadors of the United Kingdom to the Holy See
Ambassadors of the United Kingdom to Belgium
Ambassadors of the United Kingdom to Iran
Ambassadors of the United Kingdom to Japan